Minah is a South Korean idol singer, a member of the band Girl's Day.

Minah may also refer to:
, various ships by that name
Min-ah, a Korean feminine given name also spelled Mina
Francis Minah (1929–1989), Sierra Leonean politician
Jacob Minah (born 1982), German decathlete
Minah Bird (1950–1995), Nigerian model and actress

See also
Mina (disambiguation)
Minna (disambiguation)
Mynah, a bird of the starling family